Tandang Sora station is an under-construction Manila Metro Rail Transit (MRT) station situated on Line 7 located along Commonwealth Avenue in Matandang Balara, Quezon City. 

The Tandang Sora Flyover was demolished in March 2019 to give way for the construction of the MRT-7 station.

Nearest landmarks include the Iglesia ni Cristo Central Temple, New Era University and Net 25 TV studios.

The station is named after Melchora Aquino also known as Tandang Sora, one of the key personalities in the Philippine Revolution.

This station should not be confused with the future Tandang Sora Station of the Metro Manila Subway Line 9, to be constructed at the corner of Tandang Sora Avenue and Mindanao Avenue, also in Quezon City.

, the project is 66.07% complete; the station's construction is planned to be finished by June of the same year.

References

External links
Proposed Tandang Sora MRT station

Manila Metro Rail Transit System stations
Proposed railway stations in the Philippines